Cristina Cerescu (born 6 March 1995) is a Moldovan footballer who plays as a centre-back and has appeared for the Moldova women's national team.

Career
Cerescu has been capped for the Moldova national team, appearing for the team during the 2019 FIFA Women's World Cup qualifying cycle.

See also
List of Moldova women's international footballers

References

External links
 
 
 

1995 births
Living people
Moldovan women's footballers
Women's association football central defenders
FCU Olimpia Cluj players
Moldova women's international footballers
Moldovan expatriate women's footballers
Moldovan expatriate sportspeople in Romania
Expatriate women's footballers in Romania